Knott Park is a  public park in the Parkrose Heights neighborhood of northeastern Portland, Oregon, United States. The park was acquired in 1986.

References

External links

 

1986 establishments in Oregon
Northeast Portland, Oregon
Parks in Portland, Oregon